Woah or WOAH may refer to:
"Woah" (song), by Lil Baby, 2019
 WOAH (FM), a radio station licensed to Glennville, Georgia, United States
 Warcraft: Orcs and Humans, a 1994 video game
 World Organisation for Animal Health, an international veterinary organisation

See also 
 Whoa (disambiguation)